Guillaume Jeanson (sometimes William Johnson, Gilliom Shanson or Guillaume Jeançonne) (August 1721 – after   1777) was an Acadian  soldier and settler.
 Following the expulsion of the Acadians Jeanson stayed in Acadia and led a group of Acadian irregulars harrying the British. By 1762 he and his family were prisoners of the British, but they were released the next year after the conclusion of the Seven Years' War. Following his release he took an oath of allegiance to the British crown and was granted a parcel of land in what is now Grosses Coques.

References

1721 births
Year of death unknown
Canadian soldiers
Settlers of Canada
Acadian people